Piz Picuogl is a mountain of the Albula Alps, located between Mulegns and the Val Bever, in Graubünden. On its northern side lies the glacier Vadret da Calderas. On the same ridge is located the lower summit Tschima da Flix.

References

External links
 Piz Picuogl on Hikr

Mountains of Graubünden
Mountains of the Alps
Alpine three-thousanders
Mountains of Switzerland
Bever, Switzerland